Dualla (also spelled Dwalla) is a town in north-western Ivory Coast. It is a sub-prefecture and commune of Séguéla Department in Worodougou Region, Woroba District.

In 2014, the population of the sub-prefecture of Dualla was 8,130.

Villages
The fourteen villages of the sub-prefecture of Dualla and their population in 2014 are:

Notes

Sub-prefectures of Worodougou
Communes of Worodougou